The first season of the reimagined science fiction television series Battlestar Galactica, was commissioned by the Sci-Fi Channel in February 2004. The first episode, "33", was first broadcast in the United Kingdom on October 18, 2004, on Sky1, three months before its premiere in the United States on January 14, 2005 on the Sci-Fi Channel. Sky1 had negotiated first-broadcast rights of season 1 as part of its financial backing terms. The first episode of the series received a Hugo Award and the season's 13 episodes were recognized with a Peabody Award "for pushing the limits of science fiction and making it accessible to all."

The first season is a follow-up to the miniseries that first aired in December 2003.

Cast and characters

Main cast
 Edward James Olmos as William Adama
 Mary McDonnell as Laura Roslin
 Katee Sackhoff as Kara "Starbuck" Thrace
 Jamie Bamber as Lee "Apollo" Adama
 James Callis as Gaius Baltar
 Tricia Helfer as Number Six
 Grace Park as Sharon "Boomer" Valerii (Number Eight)
 Michael Hogan as Saul Tigh
 Aaron Douglas as Galen Tyrol
 Tahmoh Penikett as Karl "Helo" Agathon
 Kandyse McClure as Anastasia Dualla
 Paul Campbell as Billy Keikeya
 Alessandro Juliani as Felix Gaeta
 Samuel Witwer as Alex "Crashdown" Quartararo

Recurring cast
 Nicki Clyne as Cally Henderson
 Donnelly Rhodes as Sherman Cottle
 Callum Keith Rennie as Leoben Conoy 
 Matthew Bennett as Aaron Doral 
 Richard Hatch as Tom Zarek
 Kate Vernon as Ellen Tigh
 Lorena Gale as Elosha
 Leah Cairns as Margaret "Racetrack" Edmondson
 Bodie Olmos as Brendan "Hot Dog" Costanza
 Luciana Carro as Louanne "Kat" Katraine
 Alonso Oyarzun as Socinus
 Jennifer Halley as Diana "Hardball" Seelix
 Jill Teed as Sergeant Hadrian, Master-at-Arms

Episodes
In the following list, "Survivor count" refers to the number of surviving Colonial citizens and military, provided at some point during the episode.

Production
Battlestar Galacticas first season of thirteen one-hour episodes was ordered by the Sci-Fi Channel on February 10, 2004, with production taking place in Vancouver, British Columbia, Canada. Produced in 2004 by David Eick and Ronald D. Moore, and starring the original cast from the 2003 miniseries, it began airing in the United Kingdom and Ireland on October 18, 2004.  The series proved successful, attracting favorable comments from reviewers, and generating considerable anticipation in the U.S.

It began airing in North America three months later, on January 14, 2005 in the United States, and January 15 in Canada. The first episode aired in the U.S. became one of the highest-rated programs ever on Sci-Fi, with 3.1 million viewers. The series' first season became the network's highest-rated original series to date.

Battlestar Galacticas first episode was later made available for viewing in its entirety, and without charge from the Sci-Fi website. Moore also sought to address the "Internet Generation" by posting podcast commentaries on individual episodes on the official Sci-Fi website.

Reception

Critical response
On Rotten Tomatoes, the season has an approval rating of 90% with an average score of 8.4 out of 10 based on 20 reviews. The website's critical consensus reads, "A captivating combination of riveting political drama and science fiction fantasy make Battlestar Galactica must-see sci-fi."

Awards
Wins
 2005 Hugo Award for Best Dramatic Presentation, Short Form ("33")
 2005 Peabody Award
 2005 Spacey Award for Favorite Limited TV Series

In its statement accompanying the announcement of the show's Peabody Award, the Peabody Board noted "Battlestar Galactica is not just another apocalyptic vision of the future but an intense drama that poses provocative questions regarding religion, politics, sex and what it truly means to be 'human'....  Writers Ronald D. Moore, Toni Graphia, David Weddle, Bradley Thompson, Carla Robinson, Jeff Vlaming, Michael Angeli, and David Eick take full advantage to give us plotlines that are deeply personal and relatable, while never compromising their affinity and passion for science fiction".

Nominations
 2005 Emmy Award for Outstanding Special Visual Effects for a Series ("33", "The Hand of God")
 2005 Saturn Awards for Best Television Release on DVD (Season 1)
 2004 Visual Effects Society Award for Outstanding Performance by an Animated Character in a Live Act on Broadcast Program ("33")

Home video releases
The first season was released on DVD in region 1 on September 20, 2005, in region 2 on March 28, 2005 and in region 4 on August 15, 2006. It was also released in region 1 in HD DVD on December 4, 2007 and on Blu-ray Disc on January 5, 2010.

The sets include all 13 episodes of the first season and the miniseries. Special features include commentary on the miniseries and "33" by executive producers Ronald D. Moore, David Eick and director Michael Rymer. Moore and Eick provide commentaries for "Bastille Day", "Act of Contrition" and "You Can't Go Home Again". Beginning with episode 9, Moore began recording podcast commentaries for the episodes on the official Battlestar Galactica website; Moore provides commentaries for "Tigh Me Up, Tigh Me Down", "The Hand of God", "Colonial Day", "Kobol's Last Gleaming (Part 1)" and "Kobol's Last Gleaming (Part 2)". Behind-the-scenes featurettes include a collection of individual featurettes—"From Miniseries to Series", "Change is Good, Now They're Babes", "The Cylon Centurion", "Future/Past Technology", "The Doctor is out (of his mind)", "Production", "Visual Effects" and "Epilogue". Also included is a featurette titled "Battlestar Galactica: The Series Lowdown", deleted scenes for various episodes, and a montage of sketches and art for the series.

References

External links
 
 

2
2004 American television seasons
2005 American television seasons